Atlantic Hall is a private coeducational secondary school in Epe, Lagos State, Nigeria which holds about 600 students and is located about 70 kilometres from Lagos. It opened in 1989 in the Maryland area, Ikeja, Lagos State, with dormitories close to Eko Hospital Ikeja, before relocating to Poka Epe in the mid-nineties. Its landmark include Pobuna Junior and Senior High School with close proximity to Araga in Epe.

Principals
1989–1992: Gaynor Williams
1992–1993: A. Moses
 1993–1998: F. Phillips
 2001 to 2006: G. Hazell
 2006 to 2007: P. Redler
 2008 to 2010: M.E.Curnane
 2010 to 2020 : Andrew Jedras
 2020 to 2022 : Tunji Abimbola
 2022 to Present : Terry Howard

Curriculum

Junior Secondary School
Students spend three years in the Junior School; all programmes include Physical Education and Computer Studies.

Evaluation and Certification are based on Continuous Assessment (Form Order System) and End-of-Course Examination conducted by the Ministry of Education leading to the award of the Junior Secondary School Certificate of Education (JSSCE). In Jss3, students go ahead to sit for JSCE (BECE) and Cambridge Checkpoint.
Not to mention a junior school student has been found stealing and having relationships with girls.
But after all, its a mixed school

Senior Secondary School
Students spend three years in the Senior Secondary School. The school combines the Nigerian Curriculum with the International General Certificate of Secondary Education (IGCSE) conducted by Cambridge International Examinations (CIE). Evaluation and certification are based on continuous assessment (Form Order System) and an end-of-course examination conducted by the West African Examinations Council (WAEC), leading to the award of the West African Senior School Certificate (WASSC). In the senior secondary school, students pick among the Science, Art and Business class, depending on which career path they are interested in.

IGCSE
The International General Certificate of Secondary Education (IGCSE) programme was introduced into Atlantic Hall in September 2001 as a substitute for the Cambridge GCE 'O' Level. The IGCSE is conducted in June and November each year by Cambridge International Examinations (CIE) through the British Council. All Atlantic Hall SS2 students sit for the examination in November starting from year 2012.

The Sciences

Science education
The school has a well equipped science laboratories for Physics, Chemistry, Biology and Computer Science.

The school farm
The school farm on the campus assists the teaching of Agricultural Science. It includes both a Goat house and a Pigsty. The farm grows various crops; some of the students help in planting as projects for the Environmental Club or as class practicals.

Arts
The school provides tuition in art, music and drama.

Drama is taught as an extempore or scripted class lesson, or in a formal play. Drama productions are staged by Junior and Senior students every year.

Vocational education
Clothing and Textiles are offered as subjects in the Senior School. Students are taught about fabrics, designs and production of clothings, draperies, home decorations and fashion. Home Economics is taught in the Junior Secondary School (Foods and Nutrition in the Senior School) to introduce students to home management and basic cookery. Students can opt for this subject in the WASSCE and the IGCSE. Students are taught Technical Drawing in the Senior School. It is a practical course and the students are taught about technical and architectural drawings.

Sea School
SS2 students take the Sea School program in their first term. It helps in teaching and training students on how to survive in different conditions. It lasts for about 2 weeks and when successfully completed students receive certificates and badges.
However, due to security concerns, the Sea School program was suspended in 2018

Prefects
The prefects for the next school year are chosen when the students are in the 3rd term in SS2 after successfully completing their sea school program. The main prefects are the head girl and the head boy. There are other post such as the dining hall prefects, sports prefects among others.

Sports

The students participate in sporting activities such as soccer, basketball and swimming. An annual interhouse sports is held yearly on january.

Medical facilities
The school has a clinic with a doctor and nurses resident, in the school compound. It has both a reception and waiting area. Also, they have both a male and a female ward for students or patients that need to stay over night and be looked after.

PTA
The school has a Parent Teacher Association open to teachers and parents. They host open day's for different year groups, where parents and their children can come in and have informative conversations with their various students.

Projects
The Atlantts; it has donated a fully equipped clinic and ambulance to the school. It is currently working on a fully equipped and well-furnished sports centre.

Staff
The school staff consists of teachers, sport coordinators, cleaners, housemistresses, doctors, nurses, librarians and security guards. The number of academic and non-academic staff exceeds 150.

Students
The school caters for students aged 9 to 18. It is a boarding school, where students reside in hostels with what are called house parents. Upon enrollment, students are put into one of four houses named after gems, namely Emerald, Garnet, Sapphire and Topaz.
The students participate in some external competitions such as the Cowbell NASSMAC (National Secondary School Mathematics Competition).

Notable alumni

 Seye Ogunlewe (athlete) 
 Seni Sulyman
 Naeto C
 Idia Aisien
 Kemi Adetiba 
Mark Okoye II
Amaka Osakwe
Damilola Ogunbiyi

External links
 Official website

Secondary schools in Lagos State
Cambridge schools in Nigeria
Education in Lagos
Educational institutions established in 1989
1989 establishments in Nigeria